Standingstone was an unincorporated community in Wirt County, West Virginia.

References 

Unincorporated communities in West Virginia
Unincorporated communities in Wirt County, West Virginia